Megalostrata may refer to:

Megalostrata (poet)
Megalostrata (spider), a genus of spider family Corinnidae